Melvin Samuel Cappe,  (born December 3, 1948) is a retired Canadian civil servant and diplomat. From 2006 to 2011 he was the President and CEO of the Institute for Research on Public Policy (IRPP) in Montreal, Quebec. He was most recently Canada's High Commissioner to the United Kingdom.  He had served in Canada's government since 1975 as a deputy minister of Environment Canada, Human Resources Development and Labour, as well as Clerk of the Privy Council and Secretary to the Federal Cabinet.

Biography 
Born in Toronto, Ontario, Cappe received a Bachelor of Arts degree in economics in 1971 from New College, University of Toronto and a Master of Arts degree from the University of Western Ontario. He served as the Canadian High Commissioner to the United Kingdom from 2002 to 2006.

He is married to Marni and has two grown children, Danny and Emily.

In 2009, he was made an Officer of the Order of Canada "for his contributions to the federal public service, notably as a deputy minister, and as clerk of the Privy Council and as secretary to the Cabinet".

He is currently a professor at the University of Toronto's School of Public Policy and Governance where he teaches the capstone course and seminars on the role of government.

References
  Entry in Canada's Who's Who
 Foreign Affairs and International Trade Canada Complete List of Posts

External links 
 What ever happened to Cool Britannia? Ambassador Cappe's analysis of Tony Blair's reelection in May 2005

1948 births
Living people
Canadian economists
Clerks of the Privy Council (Canada)
Officers of the Order of Canada
People from Toronto
University of Toronto alumni
University of Western Ontario alumni
High Commissioners of Canada to the United Kingdom